Marcello Ciorciolini (16 January 1922 – 5 September 2011) was an Italian screenwriter,  director, playwright, television and radio author and lyricist.

Life and career 
Born in Rome, Ciorciolini began his career in 1950 as a radio writer, often collaborating with Alberto Talegalli. Shorty later he entered the cinema industry as screenwriter, specializing in the comedy genre and also directing a number of films.
 
As a lyricist he was author of several hits, notably Mina's "Una zebra a pois" and  "Ti guarderò nel cuore", the theme song of Mondo cane. Between 1970s and 1980s he was mainly active as an author of  television variety shows. On stage, he was active as an author of revues and comedy plays, and more sporadically of dramas.

Ciorciolini was one of the favorite authors of the comic duo Franco and Ciccio, with whom he collaborated in television, cinema and even for some songs.

Selected filmography 
Screenwriter
 Il coraggio (1955)
 Terror of the Red Mask (1960)
 The Huns (1960) 
 The Vengeance of Ursus (1961)
 Two Mafiamen in the Far West (1964)
 I due toreri (1965)
 Two Mafiosi Against Goldfinger (1965)
 Two Sergeants of General Custer (1965)
 Two Sons of Ringo (1966)

Director and screenwriter
 Con rispetto parlando (1965)
 Black Box Affair (1966) 
 I barbieri di Sicilia (1967) 
 Tom Dollar (1967) 
 Ciccio Forgives, I Don't (1968) 
 The Nephews of Zorro (1968) 
 Indovina chi viene a merenda? (1969) 
 Meo Patacca (1972)

References

External links 
 

1922 births
2011 deaths
20th-century Italian people
Italian film directors
Italian screenwriters
Writers from Rome
Italian lyricists
Italian television writers
Italian radio writers
Italian dramatists and playwrights
Italian male dramatists and playwrights
Italian male screenwriters
Male television writers